Josephine Veasey CBE (10 July 1930 – 22 February 2022) was a British mezzo-soprano, particularly associated with Wagner and Berlioz
roles.

Early years
Born in Peckham, she studied with Audrey Langford, and became a member of the Royal Opera House chorus in 1949. She made her debut as a soloist on 5 July 1955 as the Page in Salome, followed by Cherubino in Le nozze di Figaro, and later roles included Dorabella in Così fan tutte,  Marina in Boris Godunov, Preziosilla in La forza del destino, Eboli in Don Carlos, Amneris in Aida, and the title role in Carmen, amongst others. Beginning in 1957, she became a regular guest at the Glyndebourne Festival, notably as Charlotte in Werther and Octavian in Der Rosenkavalier.

Career
Noticed and encouraged by Georg Solti, Veasey began adding Wagner roles to her repertoire, notably Waltraute and Fricka in Die Walküre.  She commercially recorded the role of Frica for Deutsche Grammophon with Herbert von Karajan.  Her other major roles included Brangäne in Tristan und Isolde, Venus in Tannhäuser, and Kundry in Parsifal.  Under Colin Davis' guidance, she also became an illustrious interpreter of Berlioz's works, singing both Didon and Cassandre in Les Troyens, and Marguerite in La damnation de Faust, which she also recorded for him.

On the international scene, Veasey appeared at the Paris Opéra, the Aix-en-Provence Festival, at La Scala in Milan, the Vienna State Opera, the Salzburg Festival, the Metropolitan Opera, and the San Francisco Opera.  In contemporary works, she created the role of Andromache in Michael Tippett's King Priam in 1962, and in 1976 created The Emperor in Hans Werner Henze's We Come to the River.

Although not associated with the bel canto repertoire, in 1966 Veasey recorded the role of Agnese in Beatrice di Tenda, opposite Joan Sutherland and Luciano Pavarotti, under Richard Bonynge, and appeared as Adalgisa in Norma, opposite Montserrat Caballé and Jon Vickers, in the 1974 production at the Théâtre Antique d'Orange. Veasey retired from the stage in 1982; her last performance was as Herodias at Covent Garden, in the same opera in which she began her solo career, Salome by Richard Strauss.

Veasey died on 22 February 2022, at the age of 91.

References

Sources
Pâris, Alain, Le Dictionnaire des interprètes, Paris: Éditions Robert Laffont, 1989  
Warrack, John and Ewan West, The Oxford Dictionary of Opera,  (1992),

External links
 
 

1930 births
2022 deaths
20th-century British women opera singers
Honorary Members of the Royal Academy of Music
Operatic mezzo-sopranos
People from Peckham